Low Kii Savage (stylized as low kii savage) is the debut extended play (EP) by American singer and songwriter Kiiara. It was released on March 22, 2016, through Effess, Atlantic Records, and Warner Music Group. The EP was produced by Casper and B., Brenton Duvall, Felix Snow, and executively produced by David Singer-Vine.

Composition
Musically, Low Kii Savage is a set of songs where Kiiara breathily sings over gloomy electronic pop and trap instrumentals about, according to writer Chester Chin, "casual flirtations and epic parties." Andy Kellman of AllMusic compared it to the works of Jhené Aiko, Lorde, and Banks.

Critical reception

Brennan Carley of Spin magazine wrote that on Low Kii Savage, Kiiara "possesses all the chill of mint gum but her hooks are bubblelicious." Chin, writing for Star2.com, opined that while some of the EP's songs were "forgettable," the record was enjoyable for its "ethereal" electronic sound and Kiiara's vocal performances that made it "effortlessly sexy." Renowned for Sound disliked most of Low Kii Savage for focusing more on club music tropes and sounds than emotional impacts towards the listener, and Kellman dismissed the EP as unmemorable "of-the-moment mood music."

Commercial performance
On the Billboard week dated April 16, 2016, Low Kii Savage, debuted at number 192 on the magazine's official United States album chart and 13 on its Heatseekers Albums chart; it sold 4,000 units and 1,000 copies in its first week on the chart. On the week of June 4, due to the chart ranking streaming equivalent albums, the amount of streams on "Gold" led the EP to rise from number 165 to 153; 73% of the position rise was attributed to "Gold"'s streaming figures (4.4 million on-demand streams). By the week of July 23, Low Kii Savage went from position 114 to 78, selling 8,000 equivalent album units that week. The album finally peaked at number 41.

Singles
"Gold" was released as the lead single from the EP digitally on October 26, 2015, and later to Top 40 radio on May 10, 2016. The single became her first entry on the US Billboard Hot 100, where it peaked at number 13 in October 2016.

"Feels" was released on January 15, 2016, as the second single from the EP. "Hang Up tha Phone" premiered on Zane Lowe's Beats 1 show on March 21, 2016.

Track listing

Charts

Weekly charts

Year-end charts

Release history

References

2016 EPs
Atlantic Records EPs
Kiiara albums